Tığık or Tığıq or Tigik or Tygik may refer to:
Birincı Tığık, Azerbaijan
İkinci Tığık, Azerbaijan